A sheep dog is a dog or breed of dog traditionally used in the herding of sheep.

Sheep dog or Sheepdog may also refer to:

The Sheepdogs, a Canadian rock band
Sheepdog (song), a song from the album Bring 'Em In by Swedish band Mando Diao
Sam Sheepdog, a character in a series of animated cartoons from Looney Tunes and Merrie Melodies
Sheepdog Glory, a novel written by Roy Saunders
Sheep Dog, a 1949 Disney animated short starring Pluto and Bent-Tail the Coyote
Sheepdog, a discontinued distributed object storage system for Qemu providing volume and container services.